Wu Wenbing (born 28 July 1965) is a Chinese football midfielder who played for China in the 1988 Asian Cup. He spent his entire club career at Guangdong Winnerway and Qianwei Huandao.

Career statistics

International statistics

References

External links
Team China Stats

1965 births
1988 AFC Asian Cup players
Chinese footballers
China international footballers
Living people
Footballers from Meizhou
Place of birth missing (living people)
Association football midfielders